SS Celtic was the name of a number of ships.

, launched in 1872, serving with the White Star Line.
, which would have been known as SS Celtic when not carrying mail.

Ship names